Jacob Hufty (1750 - May 20, 1814) was a U.S. Representative from New Jersey, serving three terms from 1809 to 1814.

Early life and education
Born in New Jersey in 1750, Hufty was a blacksmith by trade.
He served as a private in the State militia.
Freeholder for Salem Township, New Jersey, 1792.

Hufty was elected overseer of the poor and collector of Salem Township, 1793.
County justice of Salem County, New Jersey, 1797, county judge in 1798, and county justice and judge, 1804.
He served as sheriff 1801–1804.
Freeholder of Salem Township 1800–1804.
He was a director of the Board of Chosen Freeholders, 1801.
He served as a member of the New Jersey Legislative Council (now the New Jersey Senate) in 1804, 1806, and 1807.
He was a county collector from 1805 to 1808.
He served as judge of Orphans Court from 1805 to 1808.
He also served as surrogate in 1808.

Congress
Hufty was elected as a Democratic-Republican to the Eleventh and Twelfth Congresses and as a Federalist to the Thirteenth Congress (March 4, 1809 – May 20, 1814).

Death
He died on May 20, 1814, in Salem, New Jersey.
He was interred in St. John's Episcopal Cemetery, Salem.

See also
 List of United States Congress members who died in office (1790–1899)

References

1750 births
1814 deaths
County commissioners in New Jersey
New Jersey sheriffs
Members of the New Jersey Legislative Council
People from Salem County, New Jersey
New Jersey Federalists
American militiamen
Burials at St. John's Episcopal Cemetery, Salem, New Jersey
Federalist Party members of the United States House of Representatives
Democratic-Republican Party members of the United States House of Representatives from New Jersey